Stephen Guarino (born November 14, 1975) is an American actor and comedian, known as Sully Patterson on the Jim Carrey-produced Showtime series I'm Dying Up Here (2017–2018) and for his recurring role as Derrick in the ABC comedy series Happy Endings, a character that has since been carried over to the NBC sitcom Marry Me, as well as Connor on the ABC sitcom Dr. Ken.

Discovered by Rosie O'Donnell, he was one of the prominent sketch comedy stars on the groundbreaking Logo TV series The Big Gay Sketch Show (2007–2010) with fellow comedians Kate McKinnon, Erica Ash, Colman Domingo, Jonny McGovern, Julie Goldman, Paolo Andino, Dion Flynn, and Michael Serrato. In 2018, he was nominated for a Daytime Emmy for his role as "Quincy" in the Netflix series EastSiders. He also  received the Outfest Best Actor award for his role in the feature film BearCity.

Early life
Guarino is originally from Orlando, Florida and was a member of SAK Comedy Lab. He graduated from Florida State University as well as The Public Theater's Shakespeare program. After appearing in numerous Off-Broadway productions, Guarino was a co-creator of the Off-Broadway improv musical The Nuclear Family with fellow members Jimmy Ray Bennett, John Gregorio, and Matthew Loren Cohen. Guarino was later cast on The Big Gay Sketch Show in 2005.

Career 
After the success of The Big Gay Sketch Show, he appeared on television shows including Law & Order: Special Victims Unit as well as the films Confessions of a Shopaholic, the BearCity franchise, and I Hate Valentine's Day  In 2011, he moved to Los Angeles after receiving a talent deal from CBS.

His first breakout role was on Happy Endings where he played Penny Hartz's (Casey Wilson) over-the-top friend Derrick for three seasons. He also appeared on The Wedding Bells, Til Death, The Neighbors, The Comeback, Marry Me, Finding Carter, Jessie, Sofia the First, Superior Donuts, 2 Broke Girls. He played Connor on ABC's Dr. Ken, Quincy on Netflix's EastSiders (Daytime Emmy nomination), and Sully Patterson on Jim Carrey's Showtime drama I'm Dying Up Here.

He has done three network pilots with James Burrows including Me & Mean Margaret, Relatively Happy, and Superior Donuts.

Guarino is appearing in Logan Paul's feature Airplane Mode (2019).

Directing and producing 

Guarino is the director of the CBS Diversity Sketch Comedy Showcase in Los Angeles (2017–present). Notable alumni include Tiffany Haddish, Kate McKinnon, Fortune Feimster, Justin Hires, Nicole Byer, Nasim Pedrad, John Milhiser.

He previously directed Kate McKinnon's one-woman show Best Actress at the Upright Citizens Brigade. He directed Showgirls: Live in Drag starring RuPaul's Drag Race stars Willam Belli, Detox Icunt, and Vicky Vox.

In 2015, Guarino co-produced and co-wrote a CBS sketch comedy pilot called The Night Crew with Michael Serrato, Steven Borzachillo, Mark Hurtado, and Ryan Noggle David Burtka, and Neil Patrick Harris starring himself Tiffany Haddish, Fortune Feimster, Jimmy Ray Bennett, and Nico Santos.

Personal life 
Guarino is gay.

Filmography

Television

Film

Awards and nominations

References

External links
 

1975 births
21st-century American comedians
21st-century American male actors
American gay actors
American male comedians
American male film actors
American male television actors
American sketch comedians
Gay comedians
LGBT people from Florida
Living people
Male actors from Florida
People from DeLand, Florida
American LGBT comedians